Kodiak may refer to:

Places
Kodiak, Alaska, a city located on Kodiak island
Kodiak, Missouri, an unincorporated community
Kodiak Archipelago, in southern Alaska
Kodiak Island, the largest island of the Kodiak archipelago
 Kodiak Launch Complex, a commercial spaceport on Kodiak Island
Kodiak Island Borough, Alaska, a borough mostly located on the island
Kodiak National Wildlife Refuge, a wilderness area in the Kodiak Archipelago
Kodiak Seamount, the oldest seamount of the Kodiak-Bowie Seamount chain

Arts, entertainment, and media
Kodiak (TV series), a television program that aired Fridays on ABC, during the 1974-75 television season in the United States
 Kodiak or GDSS Kodiak, a large spaceship in the second and fourth video games of the Command & Conquer: Tiberian series
 Kodiak, a combat unit ("mech") in the MechWarrior 2: 31st Century Combat Ghost Bear expansion
 Kodi (full name: Kodiak), a fictional character in Balto III: Wings of Change
 Kodiak, a 2010 IDW Publishing comic book

Vehicles
 Kodiak, AEV 3 Kodiak a Rheinmetall Armoured Engineer Vehicle
Kodiak, a whaling steamer
Kodiak, an all-terrain vehicle manufactured by Yamaha Motor Company
Chevrolet Kodiak, a line of large trucks sold by General Motors
Quest Kodiak, a single turboprop STOL airplane by Quest Aircraft
Škoda Kodiaq, an SUV

Other uses
Kodiak (Boy Scouts of America), the second level leadership development course for Venturers in the Boy Scouts of America's Venturing program
Kodiak bear (Ursus arctos middendorffi), also known as the Kodiak brown bear, sometimes the Alaskan brown bear
Kodiak tobacco, a brand of dipping tobacco manufactured by American Snuff Company
Mac OS X Public Beta, codenamed "Kodiak"

See also
Kodak (disambiguation)